KQAK (105.7 FM) is a commercial classic hits music radio station in Bend, Oregon.

History of the KQAK call sign
KQAK was the Federal Communications Commission (FCC) call sign of a now defunct classic rock—and, more memorably, new wave/punk/gothic/ska—radio station, "The Quake," in San Francisco, California.  See KSOL-FM under the history section for more information.

105.7 FM history
The station signed on the air on September 5, 1986 as KWBX with a classical music format, simulcasting KWAX 91.1 FM Eugene. They changed their call letters to the current KQAK and switched to an oldies format on October 19, 1990.

References

External links
Official Website

Classic hits radio stations in the United States
QAK
Radio stations established in 1986
1986 establishments in Oregon